Albania has an embassy in Berlin, a general consulate in Munich and 2 honorary consulates in Essen and Stuttgart. Germany has an embassy in Tirana.

The countries are both members of the North Atlantic Treaty Organization (NATO). As a member and founder of the European Union (EU), Germany supports Albania in its euro-integration path and is considered one of the strongest supporters of Albanian accession.

History

On 6 July 1943, the Wehrmacht massacred 107 Albanian civilians in the village of Borovë, near Korçë. The victims were between four months and 80 years old. Among the dead were infants killed in their cradles.

Normal relations between Albania and West Germany had for years been blocked by disagreement over wartime reparations, while the communist Albania had a more friendly stance on East Germany. On 2 December 1949 the communist government recognized East Germany and in 1952 diplomatic relations were established. After 1961 the relations were frozen and remained so, for more than 20 years, until in 1984, the Minister President of Bavaria Franz Josef Strauss visited the than isolated communist Albania. The trip reflected Albania's wish for warmer ties with Western Europe. He was the first prominent West European politician to visit Albania since World War II.

Diplomatic relations between both countries were established in 1986 and they have become more lively since Albania launched its democratization process in 1991.

Assistance and cooperation

Germany is the sixth largest investor in Albania in terms of exports to Albania and fifth in terms of imports.

In 2007, to further develop economic relations, the German-Albanian Chamber of Commerce and Industry in Albania (DIHA) was founded.

The biggest German direct investment is Telekom Albania. Lufthansa and Austrian Airlines operate daily direct flights from Tirana to Frankfurt and Vienna and the Tirana International Airport was owned by German investors until 2016. Prominent German companies have branches in the country or market their products via Albanian partners.

Germany also supports and gives funds to 11 Albanian schools at which German is taught as a foreign language. Graduates in possession of the bilingual Albanian school-leaving certificate are directly entitled to study at a German university.

See also
 Foreign relations of Albania
 Foreign relations of Germany 
 Accession of Albania to the European Union
 Albanians in Germany
 Germans in Albania

References

 

 
Germany
Bilateral relations of Germany